Henry Stephen may refer to:

 Henry Stephen (chemist) (1889–1965), British chemist
 Henry Stephen (musician) (1944-2021), Venezuelan singer
 Henry John Stephen (1787–1864), English legal writer
 Sir Henry Stephen (Matthew Henry Stephen 1828–1920), Australian judge

See also
Henry Stephens (disambiguation)